Peter Richards (born 1978) is a former English rugby union player.

Peter Richards may also refer to:

Peter Richards (artist) (born 1970), artist & curator, Belfast
Peter Richards, staff artist at the Exploratorium, San Francisco
Peter Richards, a supporting character from Dallas, played by Christopher Atkins
Peter Richards (Royal Navy officer) (1787–1869), British Royal Navy admiral and Third Naval Lord
Peter Richards (physician) (1936–2011), professor of medicine and president of Hughes Hall, Cambridge
Peter Felix Richards (1808–1868), pioneer Scottish merchant in post-Treaty of Nanjing Shanghai
 Pete Richards (American football) (1905–1989), American football player

See also
Peter Richards Islands, Nunavut, Canada
Richard Peters (disambiguation)